The West Georgia Wolves (UWG Wolves, formerly the West Georgia Braves) are the athletic teams that represent the University of West Georgia, located in Carrollton, Georgia, in NCAA Division II intercollegiate sports. The Wolves compete as members of the Gulf South Conference for all 13 varsity sports. West Georgia has been a member of the GSC since 1983.

Varsity teams

List of teams

Men's sports
Baseball
Basketball
Cross country
Football
Golf

Women's sports
Basketball
Cross country
Golf
Soccer
Softball
Tennis
Track and field
Volleyball

Athletic achievements
 Basketball: holds one National Association of Intercollegiate Athletics (NAIA) National Championship in 1974.
 Co-ed cheerleading: holds eight consecutive UCA Division II titles 2002-2009 and 15 total UCA division II titles for 2011, 2014, 2015, 2016, 2017, 2018, 2019 wins.
 All-female cheerleading: has earned 6 UCA Division II National Championships in 2004, 2006, 2007, 2008, 2011, 2012. And 3 UCA Division I National Championships in 2013, 2017 and 2019.

Cross country
Tim Brooks, former member of the 1999 Gulf South Conference Championship men's cross country team, was named head coach of the men's and women's teams in 2010. Coach Ryan Bailey took over the Head Coaching position in 2017.

Football
 For the current season, see 2022 West Georgia Wolves football team.

Program achievements

Softball 
West Georgia's softball team appeared in one Women's College World Series in 1974.

Men's basketball 
The University of West Georgia men's basketball program has been a contender in the Gulf South since joining in 1983. They have had 40 players named to the All Gulf South Teams, 17 players named to NCAA All-American Teams, Appeared in 27 Gulf South Conference Tournaments, and 18 NCAA Tournaments. The 1974 team, coached by Roger Kaiser, won the NAIA National Championship.

Facilities

University Stadium

In 2003, the University of West Georgia acquired  from the city of Carrollton for the purpose of creating a stadium and athletic complex. Such a facility would serve a dual role: give the UWG sports teams a facility that they could use, and aid the university in attracting additional students. The funding for this venture was made possible through private donations and increased student fees approved by the Student Government Association.

During the summer of 2008, construction began on this facility and, in the fall of 2009, the University Stadium opened. The stadium seats roughly 9,600, providing ample space for any sporting or entertainment event. Additionally, the new athletic complex includes a stadium and practice field for the Wolves’ soccer program, a new softball stadium and a women's field house with locker-room facilities for women's sports. There are plans to relocate Cole Field from its current location beside the Biology Building to the Athletic Complex.

On October 4, 2014, the University Stadium hosted its first Top-25 matchup in its 6-year history. The game was between the then #24 UWG Wolves and the #22 UWA Tigers. It was the first time that Coach Will Hall faced his former team. The final scored showed just how tough of a game it would be as UWG edged out UWA 26–17. It was UWG's first win in the series after 5 previous tries.

The Coliseum
The Coliseum is an on-campus indoor arena in Carrollton, Georgia. It is primarily used for basketball and volleyball, and is the home field of the University of West Georgia. The arena holds 6,475 spectators and opened in 2009. The total construction cost was $24.7 million.

The concourse level of the facility includes a two-story lobby that offers an area for event pre-function gatherings.  The concourse level also features concession stands and restrooms.

The lower level of the facility houses the floor of the arena, spacious locker rooms for the men and women basketball teams, the volleyball team, visiting teams, and referees.  Additionally, this level includes a trainer's facility.  The Coliseum has a maple wood floor surrounded by seating and a four-sided, state-of-the-art video scoreboard suspended over center court.

The upper level includes three large skyboxes for UWG officials, boosters, and friends to gather during events.

The Coliseum hosts UWG commencement ceremonies, concerts, and other various events.  The Georgia High School Association Class AAAAA and AAAA boys' and girls' basketball quarterfinal round of the playoffs are also held at this facility annually.

In July 2021, the Coliseum floor was redone in accordance with the change in the three-point line for NCAA Basketball contests. The new design and finishing was done by CBA Sports, a company led by NBA legend Dominique Hawkins.

References

External links